Teleman are an English indie pop band formed in London in 2011. The group consists of Thomas Sanders (vocals, guitar), Pete Cattermoul (bass) and Hiro Amamiya (drums).

History

Pete Cattermoul and brothers Jonny and Thomas Sanders were previously members of indie band Pete and the Pirates. Following the disbanding of that group in 2011, the three started writing and recording new music under the name Teleman, adding drummer Hiro Ama. The band's name was inspired by an album in a charity shop by composer Georg Philipp Telemann.

Teleman's debut single Cristina was released in early 2013, with the debut album Breakfast coming in mid-2014, produced by Bernard Butler. Further singles from the album included "23 Floors Up", "Skeleton Dance" and "Mainline". "Lady Low" from the record featured Stephen Black on saxophone. The band toured supporting Suede, Metronomy, Maxïmo Park, Kaiser Chiefs and Franz Ferdinand, and appeared in festivals including Glastonbury, Green Man, End of the Road and Les Inrocks.

In 2014 and 2015 Teleman toured Europe and the US, while preparing to record their second album. They released the stand-alone single "Strange Combinations" in March 2015.

In 2016, they opened for Belle and Sebastian on tour.

Teleman's second album, Brilliant Sanity, was released in April 2016. Two singles were released from it previously: "Fall in Time" and "Düsseldorf".

The band have been championed by radio presenter Marc Riley, who booked them for a session on his BBC 6 Music show in January 2013. Two further sessions were recorded in 2014. They also appeared on his BBC Online music show "All Shook Up" in 2015  and played four songs live in session on Riley's show on 6 April 2016. The group played two tracks live on Lauren Laverne's BBC 6 Music show 6 Music Live Room on 6 September 2018 promoting the release of their new album.

On 15 September 2020, the band announced that keyboard player Jonny had departed the band.

Related projects

Thomas Sanders has recorded music under his solo name, Tap Tap. As of 2020, he began using the name Tom Sanders when releasing solo music, with "Baby All You've Got" being his first single. Sanders's debut solo LP, "Only Magic", was released on 4 December 2020 through Moshi Moshi Records.

Hiro Amamiya has released remixes under the name Hiro Ama. He released his debut EP "Uncertainty" on 4 September 2020 through Prah Recordings.

Former band member, Jonny Sanders, creates music & lyric videos under the name Prehuman, including some for Teleman.

Discography

Albums
 Breakfast, Moshi Moshi (2014) UK #65
 Brilliant Sanity, Moshi Moshi (2016) UK #51
 Family of Aliens, Moshi Moshi (2018) UK #40
 Good Time/Hard Time, Moshi Moshi (2023)

Extended plays
 Fünf, Moshi Moshi (2017)
 Sweet Morning, Moshi Moshi (2021)

Remix albums
 Family of Remixes, Moshi Moshi (2019)

Non-album releases
Strange Combinations (single, 2015)

References

External links

Musical groups established in 2012
English indie rock groups
Musical groups from London
Moshi Moshi Records artists
2012 establishments in England